The One and Only is a 1999 Danish romantic comedy film directed by Susanne Bier. The film starred Sidse Babett Knudsen, Niels Olsen, Rafael Edholm, and Paprika Steen in story about two unfaithful married couples faced with becoming first-time parents. The film was considered to mark a modern transition in Danish romantic comedies, and became the third biggest box-office success of the 1990s in Denmark. The film earned both the Robert Award and Bodil Award as the Best Film of 1999.

Cast
Sidse Babett Knudsen as Sus
Niels Olsen as Niller
Paprika Steen as Stella
 as Lizzie
Sofie Gråbøl as Mulle
 as Knud
Rafael Edholm as Andrea aka Sonny
Hella Joof as the adoption lady
Liv Corfixen as beauty clinic customer
Charlotte Munck as beauty clinic customer
Klaus Bondam as Priest
Lars Kjeldgaard as one of the couples with new kitchen
 as one of the couples with new kitchen
Vanessa Gouri as Mgala
 as the Doctor
 Beauty clinic chief

Box office
The film was the most successful Danish film for 15 years with admissions of 820,000 and a gross of 38.5 million Krone ($5.5 million) in Denmark.

References

External links

1999 romantic comedy films
Best Danish Film Bodil Award winners
Best Danish Film Robert Award winners
Danish romantic comedy films
Films directed by Susanne Bier